An orange blossom is the flower of the orange tree.

Orange blossom may also refer to:
 Choisya, a genus of evergreen shrub
 Orange Blossom, a French electronica band
 Orange Blossom, California, an unincorporated community
 Orange Blossom Special
 Orange Blossom Special (song), fiddle tune about the train

Orange blossoms may refer to:
 Orange Blossoms (musical), a 1922 musical by Victor Herbert
 Orange Blossoms (album), a 2008 album by JJ Grey & Mofro
 124th New York Volunteer Infantry Regiment, known as the Orange Blossoms, an American Civil War regiment 
 Casa Loma Orchestra, an American swing band also known as the Orange Blossoms